The Albums 2000–2010 is a box set by Australian recording artist Kylie Minogue. It was released by Parlophone Records on 18 July 2011. The five-disc box set was released in Europe, and Australasia, and included all of Minogue's studio albums from the years 2000 to 2010; Light Years (2000), Fever (2001), Body Language (2003), X (2007), and Aphrodite (2010). The cover sleeve for the album consisted of fragments from the original artworks inserted into Minogue's silhouette from her cover for Fever (2001). The Albums 2000–2010 marked Minogue's first box set collection until her October 2012 release, K25: Time Capsule.

Upon its release, The Albums 2000-2010 received positive reception from most of the reviewers, who complimented the overall packaging of the box set and her releases through Parlophone. Some of the critics were unimpressed with the exclusion of her work from the PWL and Deconstruction period. The box set charted on the UK Albums Chart at number 37, and on the Scottish Albums Chart at number 40.

Background and packaging
It was first announced on Minogue's official website in May 2011 that EMI would be releasing a five-CD box set. The set includes every previous studio album Minogue had released from 2000 up until 2010; the original versions of Light Years (2000), Fever (2001), Body Language (2003), X (2007), and Aphrodite (2010), with each disc housed in a cardboard sleeve. The cardboard sleeves contain the original album artwork and one image from each album photo shoot imprinted inside the cardboard sleeve, without the album or Minogue's logo imprinted. Each box set features a 15" x 10" poster that features the credits and album artworks of the original albums. Inside the box, each of the albums represents a significant colour, as displayed on the cover: Light Years is light blue, Fever is white, Body Language is black, X is red, and Aphrodite is navy blue.

The box set carries out the original first press releases of each album, meaning that the hidden track from Light Years, "Password", is featured on the box set, and all released singles from each album use their single edit, and not the album edit. The only song to be absent is the bilingually-altered tracks for Minogue's single, "Your Disco Needs You", which appeared as a bonus track on Light Years in different regions. It was her first greatest hits box set to be released; in October 2012, to commemorate her twenty-fifth year in music business, she released her second, all-singles box set, K25: Time Capsule.

Reception

The Albums 2000–2010 received positive reviews from most reviewers. A writer from The Sun awarded the box set a perfect five star rating, stating "Whether you like hot-pant Kylie, indie Kylie, girl-next-door Kylie or dark Kylie, there's something for every Kylie fan in this special box-set. Made up of five albums and celebrating ten years of tunes, we challenge you to get them out of your head." Scott Harrah from Stagezine awarded the album four-and-a-half stars out of five, but did not review the box set; instead, he reviewed each album individually because "all [albums] are so different in both sound and concept." Jon O'Brien from AllMusic awarded the album three-and-a-half stars, labelling her earlier work as "infectious". Despite being critical towards the lack of inclusion of her 1994–1998 Deconstruction work, and the inclusion of her albums, X, and Aphrodite, he concluded "Kylie has yet to make that one essential album, and the going-through-the-motions nature of her later releases suggests her time may have passed, but this box set still contains plenty of moments to justify her position as one of the all-time premier pop princesses."

Writing in retrospect for Daily Express, reviewer Simon Gage was critical of Minogue's lack of musical progression, charisma, and thought that she lacked a "great voice". He stated "There are dodgy tracks and the 'voice', more processed than a tinned pea, does start to grate but it's still pretty good." He awarded the box set three stars. British journalist Paul Du Noyer reviewed the box set, and complimented Minogue's Parlophone work as "ambiguous pop". However, he stated "There’s a lot of ambitious pop in here, but no conceptual overreach. Not even her experience of breast cancer was allowed to surface in Kylie’s subsequent material: lyrically, it was straight back to business. It seems unlikely such a 20-year lucky streak could be sustained without a lot of shrewd decisions by Minogue herself. So it seems that everyone is right after all: Kylie is A Good Thing, and here is just enough of it."

In the United Kingdom, the box set debuted at number thirty-seven on the UK Albums Chart, becoming Minogue's nineteenth album entry since her debut album, Kylie (1987). The box set stayed in for one week on the top 100 chart. The Albums 2000-2010 also debuted at number forty on the Scottish Albums Chart for a sole week.

Track listing

Charts

Release history

Notes

References

External links
 The Albums 2000–2010 at Kylie.com (archived from 2012)

2011 compilation albums
Kylie Minogue compilation albums
Parlophone compilation albums